The Last Pin is a series of mystery stories by author Howard Wandrei. It was released in 1996 by F & B Mystery in an edition of 1,600 copies of which 100 were specially bound and released in a slipcase with Wandrei's Saith the Lord.  The stories originally appeared in the magazines Detective Fiction Weekly, Private Detective Stories, Detective Action Stories, Spicy Detective Stories, Romantic Detective, and Black Mask under Wandrei's pseudonyms, Robert A. Garron and H. W. Guernsey.

Contents

 Introduction, by D. H. Olson
 "Smot Guy"
 "Wrong Number"
 "I’ll Be Murdering You"
 "The Man with the Molten Face"
 "League of Bald Men"
 "Marked in Indigo"
 "Too Good Looking"
 "Dressed to Kill"
 "Jongkovski’s Wife"
 "Fur-Bearing Animal"
 "The Last Pin"

References

1996 short story collections
Mystery short story collections
Fedogan & Bremer books